Mahiro Nishigori is a Japanese professional footballer who plays as a midfielder for WE League club Nojima Stella.

Club career 
Nishigori made her WE League debut on 12 September 2021.

References 

Living people
Japanese women's footballers
Women's association football midfielders
Nojima Stella Kanagawa Sagamihara players
WE League players
Year of birth missing (living people)